Nikolai Kapitonovich Nikolski (Николай Капитонович Никольский, sometimes transliterated as Nikolskii, born 16 November 1940) is a Russian mathematician, specializing in real and complex analysis and functional analysis.

Nikolski received in 1966 his Candidate of Sciences degree (PhD) from the Leningrad State University under Viktor Khavin with thesis Invariant subspaces of certain compact operators (title translated from Russian). In 1973 he received his Doctor of Sciences degree (habilitation). He was an academician at the Steklov Institute of Mathematics in Leningrad and taught at Leningrad State University. In the 1990s he became a professor at the University of Bordeaux.

Nikolski's research deals with operator theory, harmonic analysis, and complex analysis.

He was an Invited Speaker with talk What problems do spectral theory and functional analysis solve for each other? at the ICM in 1978 in Helsinki. In 2012 he was elected a Fellow of the American Mathematical Society.

His doctoral students include Nikolai Makarov and Alexander Volberg.

Nikolski was one of the Leningrad mathematicians who in 1984 verified the correctness of the proof of the Bieberbach conjecture by Louis de Branges.

Selected publications

Articles

with V. I. Vasyunin:

Books
as editor: Investigations in linear operators and function theory, New York: Consultants Bureau 1972
as editor: Spectral theory of functions and operators , 2 vols., American Mathematical Society 1980
as editor with Viktor Petrovich Khavin and Sergei V. Khrushchev: Linear and complex analysis problem book: 199 research problems, Springer Verlag 1984
with V. P. Khavin: Linear and complex analysis problem book 3, 2 vols., Springer Verlag 1994
as editor: Toeplitz operators and spectral function theory: essays from the Leningrad Seminar on Operator Theory, Birkhäuser 1989
as editor with Éric Charpentier and Annick Lesne: Kolmogorov´s Heritage in Mathematics, Springer Verlag 2007
as editor: Functional analysis I: linear functional analysis, Springer Verlag 1992
as editor with V. P. Khavin: Complex analysis, operators, and related topics : the S.A. Vinogradov memorial volume, Birkhäuser 2000
Treatise on the shift operator. Spectral function theory, Grundlehren der mathematischen Wissenschaften 273, Springer Verlag 1986

References

External links
mathnet.ru
Nicolas Nikolski, fiche personnelle, Université de Bordeaux

20th-century Russian mathematicians
21st-century Russian mathematicians
Soviet mathematicians
Saint Petersburg State University alumni
Academic staff of Saint Petersburg State University
Academic staff of the University of Bordeaux
Fellows of the American Mathematical Society
1940 births
Living people